Ochamchire Municipality (Očamčiris municip’alit’et’i) is an administrative unit in the Georgian Autonomous Republic of Abkhazia. The capital of the municipality is Ochamchire. Ochamchire Municipality has boundaries with Gulripshi Municipality and Gali Municipality of Autonomous Republic of Abkhazia and Tsalenjikha Municipality of Samegrelo-Zemo Svaneti.

Districts of Georgia (country)